Perpetua was a third-century Christian martyr.

Perpetua or Perpétua may also refer to:

People
 Perpetua of Hippo (died c. 423), abbess and sister of Augustine of Hippo
 Maria Perpétua (1790–1817), a Brazilian alleged witch
 Perpétua Almeida (born 1964), Brazilian politician, banker and teacher
 Perpetua Nkwocha (born 1976), Nigerian footballer
 Perpetua Pope (1916–2013), Scottish landscape painter
 Perpetua Sappa Konman (born 1972), Micronesian physician and politician
 Perpetua Siyachitema (born 1983), Zimbabwean netball player

Other uses
 Perpetua (typeface), serif typeface designed by Eric Gill
 Perpetua (film) or Love's Boomerang, a 1922 crime film
 Cape Perpetua, headland in Oregon, United States
 Perpetua oilfield, Angola
 Perpetua Press, a 1930s English printing press

See also

 Lux perpetua (disambiguation)
 Perpetual (disambiguation)
 Esto perpetua, the state motto of Idaho
 Reclusión perpetua, a variant of life imprisonment 
 St. Perpetua School, a school in California